MQM may refer to:

 Muttahida Qaumi Movement – London (MQM)
 Muttahida Qaumi Movement – Pakistan (MQM-P)
 Muhajir Qaumi Movement – Haqiqi (MQM-H)
 Mardin Airport, Turkey (IATA: MQM)
 South Marquesan language (ISO 639-3: mqm)